The 2003 Armenian Premier League season was the twelfth since its establishment. It was contested by 12 teams, and Pyunik FC won the championship.

Overview
 FC Armavir are promoted, but withdrew before the start of the season.
 FC Araks are promoted and replaced FC Armavir.
 Spartak Yerevan were dissolved and the players moved to Banants Yerevan.

League table

Results

First half of season

Second half of season

See also
 2003 in Armenian football
 2003 Armenian First League
 2003 Armenian Cup

References
Armenia - List of final tables (RSSSF)

Armenian Premier League seasons
1
Armenia
Armenia